A by-election was called in the constituency of Littleborough and Saddleworth in Greater Manchester, England, on 27 July 1995 following the death of Conservative Party MP Geoffrey Dickens on 17 May of that year.

The contest was a win for the Liberal Democrat candidate Chris Davies. The result was notable as the defending Conservative Party dropped from first to third place, coming behind both the Labour Party and the Liberal Democrats. Davies' conduct during the by-election was controversial owing to him openly campaigning while the sitting MP Geoffrey Dickens was dying from liver cancer.

The second-placed Labour candidate, Phil Woolas, defeated Davies at the 1997 general election in the successor seat of Oldham East and Saddleworth. He held the seat until 2010. Davies went on to represent the North West England region in the European Parliament from 1999 to 2014.

Results

Notes on candidates
Mr Blobby was a character on the British television show Noel's House Party. The candidate had changed his name from John McLagan for the purposes of the election. The candidate was not officially endorsed by the BBC, nor was McLagan the actual actor of Mr Blobby.
The candidate L. McLaren used the party description "Probity for Imposed Candidates"

See also
Littleborough and Saddleworth (UK Parliament constituency)
Oldham East and Saddleworth (UK Parliament constituency)
2011 Oldham East and Saddleworth by-election
List of United Kingdom by-elections

References

External links
Campaign literature from the by-election

Littleborough and Saddleworth by-election
Littleborough and Saddleworth by-election
1990s in Greater Manchester
Littleborough and Saddleworth by-election
By-elections to the Parliament of the United Kingdom in Greater Manchester constituencies
Elections in the Metropolitan Borough of Oldham
Elections in the Metropolitan Borough of Rochdale